Valentina Kamenyok-Vinogradova (May 17, 1943 – July 17, 2002) was a volleyball player for the USSR. Born in Moscow, she competed for the Soviet Union at the 1964 and 1968 Summer Olympics.

References 

1943 births
2002 deaths
Sportspeople from Moscow
Soviet women's volleyball players
Russian women's volleyball players
Olympic volleyball players of the Soviet Union
Olympic gold medalists for the Soviet Union
Olympic silver medalists for the Soviet Union
Olympic medalists in volleyball
Volleyball players at the 1964 Summer Olympics
Volleyball players at the 1968 Summer Olympics
Medalists at the 1964 Summer Olympics
Medalists at the 1968 Summer Olympics
Honoured Masters of Sport of the USSR
Burevestnik (sports society) athletes